United We Stand is a release by Glen Campbell's eldest daughter Debby. Debby Campbell has been performing with her father since 1987. She was a featured vocalist on the Glen Campbell Goodtime Theater shows in Branson, Missouri during the mid 90s. United We Stand was released as a cassette only. It was sold in record stores and the Goodtime Theatre in Branson and after concerts during tours. Next to solo recordings, it contains four duets with Glen Campbell, two of which were recorded live at the shows.

Track listing
Side 1:

 Medley:" (live)
 "United We Stand" (Hiller/Simons)
 "Little Green Apples" (Russell)
 "Canadian Sunset" (Gimbel/Heywood)
 "My Elusive Dreams" (Sherril/Putman)
 "United We Stand" (reprise)
 "Take Me As I Am" (Dipiero/Staley)
 "Let It Be Me" (Bacaud/Delanoe/Curtis) (live)
 "Supermom's Taking The Night Off" (Dayton)
 "The Woman In Me" (Twain/Lange)

Side 2:

 "All I Have To Do Is Dream" (Bryant)
 "Silver Threads And Golden Needles" (Reynolds)
 "You Make It So Easy" (Stewart/Weatherly/Kees)
 "I Saw The Light" (Gold/Angelle)
 "Blind Hearted" (White/Goodrum)

Personnel
Debby Campbell - vocals
Glen Campbell - vocals on "Medley", "Let It Be Me", "All I Have to Do Is Dream", "Silver Threads And Golden Needles"
Gary Bruzzese - drums
Jeff Dayton - acoustic guitars, electric guitar, baritone guitar
Noel Kirkland - synthesizer, acoustic guitar
T.J. Kuenster - electric grand piano
Kenny Scaggs - pedal steel, acoustic guitars
Russ Scagggs- bass guitar.
Wes Westmoreland - fiddle

Production
Producer - Jeff Dayton
Photography - Gary Gingrich
Art direction - Joe Van Dolah
Mixed by Steve Judd, Jeff Dayton
"Medley" arranged by T.J. Kuenster
Recorded by StevMatador Judd at the Glen Campbell Goodtime Theatre, Branson, Missouri
Copyright - 1995 Branson Theatre Corporation

1995 albums